High Point is a historic home located near Jenkinsville, Fairfield County, South Carolina.  The original section was built about 1800, and is a two-story, five bay, frame farmhouse with later expansions. A two-story rear ell was built about 1870. It features a one-story, shed-roofed porch across the front façade supported by square posts.  Also on the property are the contributing family cemetery, a frame smoke house, and a frame barn.

It was added to the National Register of Historic Places in 1984.

References

Houses on the National Register of Historic Places in South Carolina
Houses completed in 1800
Houses in Fairfield County, South Carolina
National Register of Historic Places in Fairfield County, South Carolina